WMEC may refer to:

USCG Medium Endurance Cutter, one of two classes of US Coast Guard vessel
WMEC (TV), a television station (channel 36, virtual 22) licensed to serve Macomb, Illinois